Greg Howes (born March 26, 1977 in Tacoma, Washington) is an American soccer player, most recently coach for Las Vegas Legends in the Professional Arena Soccer League.

Career
In 1995, Howes graduated from Franklin Pierce High School.  He played his freshman season of collegiate soccer at Stetson University.  He then transferred to Oregon State University, playing soccer there in 1998 and 1999.  In 1999, he played for the Willamette Valley Firebirds of the Premier Development League.  On February 7, 2000, the Seattle Sounders selected Howes in the first round (eighth overall) of the USL A-League draft.  He tied for third on the points list that season and was named the 2000 A-League Rookie of the Year.  On October 10, 2000, Howes signed with the Milwaukee Wave in the National Professional Soccer League.  He was selected to the 2000-2001 All Rookie team.  He would play each winter indoor season with the Wave until 2008.  After 2001, the team was renamed the Major Indoor Soccer League.  On February 8, 2001, the Sounders traded Howes to the Portland Timbers in exchange for a second and third round draft pick and cash.  He spent two seasons with the Timbers before being released at the end of the 2002 season.  In April 2003, Howes joined the Milwaukee Wave United an outdoor expansion team built around the Milwaukee Wave roster.  He played for the Rochester Raging Rhinos in 2005 and 2006 before returning to the Seattle Sounders in 2007. Howes was part of the Seattle squad which won the 2007 USL-1 championship.  In 2008 Howes signed with the Stockton Cougars of the Professional Arena Soccer League. in the Professional Arena Soccer League. Howes was the MVP of the MISL three years in a row, in 2005 and 2006, and has played for the United States national futsal team.

In 2008, Howes was player/head coach of the Tacoma Stars, a Professional Arena Soccer League team. On March 28, 2009, Howes was announced at the player/head coach of Tacoma Tide in the USL Premier Development League. He was replaced by Gerry Gray in April 2010.

In 2011, Howes was inducted into the Milwaukee Wave Hall of Fame.  That same year, he came back to the Milwaukee Wave.  He scored a goal in the championship game, which the Wave won.

In 2012, he became the first head coach of the Las Vegas Legends in the Professional Arena Soccer League. He led the team to a division win and the playoffs in 2012–13 Las Vegas Legends season.

In 2014, he became the head coach of Washington Premier Soccer Clubs BU97

Honors

Seattle Sounders
USL First Division Championship (1): 2007
USL First Division Commissioner's Cup (1): 2007

References

1977 births
Living people
American soccer coaches
American soccer players
Seattle Sounders Select players
Major Indoor Soccer League (2001–2008) players
Milwaukee Wave United players
National Professional Soccer League (1984–2001) players
Oregon State Beavers men's soccer players
Professional Arena Soccer League coaches
Professional Arena Soccer League players
Portland Timbers (2001–2010) players
Rochester New York FC players
Seattle Sounders (1994–2008) players
Soccer players from Tacoma, Washington
Seattle Sounders FC U-23 players
USL First Division players
USL League Two players
Willamette Valley Firebirds players
Major Indoor Soccer League (2008–2014) players
Milwaukee Wave players
A-League (1995–2004) players
Association football midfielders
American men's futsal players
Stetson Hatters men's soccer players
California Cougars players
Tacoma Stars coaches
Tacoma Stars players
USL League Two coaches
Association football player-managers
Las Vegas Legends